The 2022–23 St. John's Red Storm men's basketball team represented St. John's University during the 2022–23 NCAA Division I men's basketball season. They were coached by Mike Anderson, in his fourth year at the school, and played their home games at Carnesecca Arena and Madison Square Garden as members of the Big East Conference. They finished the season 17–14, 7–13 in Big East Play to finish in 8th place. They won their opening round match against Butler in the Big East tournament before losing in the quarterfinals to Marquette.

Previous season
The Red Storm finished the season 17–15, 8–11 in Big East play to finish in a tie for seventh place. As the No. 7 seed in the Big East tournament, they defeated DePaul in the first round before losing to Villanova in the quarterfinals.

Offseason

Departures

Incoming transfers

Recruiting classes

2022 recruiting class

2023 recruiting class

Roster

Schedule and results

|-
!colspan=12 style=| Exhibition

|-
!colspan=12 style=| Regular season

|-
!colspan=12 style=|Big East tournament

Rankings

References

St. John's
St. John's Red Storm men's basketball seasons
Saint John's